The front office is the part of a company that comes in contact with clients, such as the marketing, sales, and service departments.  The term has more specific meaning in different industries.

Types

General offices

The function of front office is to directly get in touch with customers, and is usually the first place that customers get to when they arrive to the company. The front office can discover more information about the customer by asking them questions, also helping the customers out.

Staff working in the front office can also deal with simple tasks, such as sorting out emails, helping out on printing and typing works. Front office staff need to use different skills on technologies too, such as using the printers, fax machines and phone. This is the reason why training is needed before the staffs start to work, although some might only be simple tasks. The most common work for the front office worker will be a mix of getting in touch with customers and also helping out internally in the office.

Other simple tasks, like taking customers’ jackets or serving drinks to customers might also be part of the front office staff’s job.

Hotel

This is the place where customers first arrive in the hotel, where they can check in at the front desk. Employees working in the front desk will also help customers with problems and complaints.

The front office in the hotel industry, also called the reception area, which the receptionist is the one who get in touch with the customers, most importantly, confirm their reservation and answering their questions. The receptionist in the front office will pick up phone calls from customers too, welcome customers and also help customers checking out at last.

The employees who work in the lobby of the hotel are also part of the front office as they get in touch with customers directly. They will show customers the way and carry the luggage for them. There are different parts in the front office of a hotel, which included reception, providing services when customers asked, mailing information, concierge and employees who manage with money.

Banking

The front office of investment banking, mainly deal with sales and trading. As this is the most important role in the front office, employees generally receive the highest salary compared to staff in the same position in other industries.

Sports

In some sports businesses, the front office usually gets in touch with the players and organizes activities for them. The front office staff is usually the one that has the highest position in the sports team, who can control the whole team.

Challenges faced by front offices
The motivation of the front office staff might be low as they are doing repetitive work. This is a very important issue as these staff will get in touch with customers the most and this might affect the profitability and efficiency of the company. The staff might have high level of stress as they might always meet bad-tempered customers. They might get a lot of complaints as well so it is hard for front office staff to maintain their good services.

See also
 Front of house — a synonym of front office used by facilities management industry, or a similar term used in arts and entertainment venues for business of dealing with customers
 Middle office
 Back office

References

Business terms